Taysir may refer to:
Mohammed Atef
Taysir Khalid
Taysir Hayb